John Van Buren Tavern is a historic inn and tavern building located near Fulton in Oswego County, New York.  It is a -story, three-by-five-bay, brick building with a side-gable roof. It was built sometime between 1800 and 1821 and operated as a tavern into the 1860s, when it was converted to a residence.  Also on the property are a contributing smokehouse and house lived in while the tavern was under construction.

It was listed on the National Register of Historic Places in 1988.

References

Drinking establishments on the National Register of Historic Places in New York (state)
Federal architecture in New York (state)
Hotel buildings on the National Register of Historic Places in New York (state)
Buildings and structures in Oswego County, New York
Taverns in New York (state)
National Register of Historic Places in Oswego County, New York
Taverns on the National Register of Historic Places in New York (state)